Epipsestis bilineata is a moth of the family Drepanidae first described by Warren in 1915. It is found from India and Nepal to Taiwan.

Subspecies
Epipsestis bilineata bilineata (northern India, Nepal)
Epipsestis bilineata pallida Yoshimoto, 1984 (Taiwan)

References

Moths described in 1915
Thyatirinae